Jonathan Run is a stream in the U.S. state of West Virginia.

Jonathan Run has the name of Jonathan Minear.

See also
List of rivers of West Virginia

References

Rivers of Tucker County, West Virginia
Rivers of West Virginia